Arthur J. Miller was a member of the Wisconsin State Assembly.

Biography
Miller was born on October 27, 1887, in Milwaukee, Wisconsin. He went on to work for companies specializing in the building of bridges and other structures.

Political career
Miller was elected to the Assembly in 1926. Additionally, he was a North Milwaukee, Wisconsin, alderman from 1924 to 1926. He was a Republican.

References

Politicians from Milwaukee
Republican Party members of the Wisconsin State Assembly
Wisconsin city council members
1887 births
Year of death missing